Philip Todd Frye (born in Washington, D.C.) is a former professional American football running back in the National Football League. He played with the Minnesota Vikings in 1987.

In the early 1980s, Frye was a running back at California Lutheran University, where he was a 1983 graduate. He was later a university football coach for Cal Lutheran (assistant football strength coach), Hawaii (football head strength coach), and UCLA (head strength and conditioning coach). He has been a strength and conditioning coach at EXOS since 2014.

References

External links
Location
NFL Stats
NCSA Info 

1958 births
Living people
Players of American football from Washington, D.C.
Minnesota Vikings players
National Football League replacement players
Cal Lutheran Kingsmen football players